The Colorado Organic Act was enacted in Colorado Territory in 1861. It passed by Congress and signed by President James Buchanan on February 28, 1861, and established four-year terms for Governor, Secretary and Legislative Assembly of the territory and defined their duties. Provisions were made for delegates to the United States Congress, county and township officials, schools, courts, census-taking, and elections. Eligibility for voting was stipulated as white male residents over the age of 21. It preserved the rights of Native Americans. It was amended in 1863 and 1867, and revised in 1867, primarily focusing on legal rights and procedures.

It was created as the free Territory of Colorado. The new territory is created from the Former unorganized territory previously part of the Territory of Kansas, the northern portion of the Territory of New Mexico, the eastern portion of the Territory of Utah, and the southwestern portion of the Territory of Nebraska.  The new name is chosen because the Colorado River is thought to originate somewhere in the territory.  The boundaries of the Colorado Territory are essentially the same as the present State of Colorado.

References

History of Colorado